Following the Dutch general election of 2010, held on 9 June, a process of cabinet formation started, which typically involves three phases:
 exploring with which parties to form a coalition,
 negotiating to draft a coalition agreement (Dutch: regeerakkoord),
 dividing the posts in the new cabinet.

Formation timeline 

On June 10 and 11 the chairs of parliamentary parties (fractievoorzitters) of the House of Representatives (Tweede Kamer) gave advice to the Queen on who should be appointed informateur and who should be involved in the first information talks. 
The leaders of the political parties with most seats indicated that an informateur from the VVD, the largest party after the election, should investigate the possibility of a coalition with the PVV, which achieved the biggest gain of seats.

Informateur Rosenthal 
On June 12 Queen Beatrix nominated Uri Rosenthal, chairman of the VVD in the Senate (Eerste Kamer), as informateur, in order to investigate, first, the possibility of a coalition containing VVD and PVV.

On June 14 Rosenthal met with all party leaders individually. Maxime Verhagen (CDA) wanted VVD and PVV to bridge their mutual differences before joining in discussions between those two parties. After two days of joint talks with Mark Rutte (VVD) and Geert Wilders (PVV), and individually with the leaders of VVD, PVV and CDA, on June 17 Rosenthal had to conclude that a combination of these three parties was impossible.

On June 18 Rosenthal conferred subsequently with Job Cohen (PvdA), Maxime Verhagen (CDA), Alexander Pechtold (D66), Femke Halsema (GroenLinks) and Mark Rutte (VVD). Two coalitions were possible with these parties: Purple-plus (Paars-plus) (VVD+PvdA+D66+GL) and a center-coalition of VVD+PvdA+CDA. Purple-plus was the preference of PvdA, D66 and GroenLinks, while Rutte was in favour of the center-coalition. At the end of the day informateur Rosenthal announced that he would explore the possibilities for Purple-plus, starting on Monday, June 21.

After one and a half days of discussions with Rutte, Cohen, Halsema and Pechtold, VVD-chair Mark Rutte announced on June 22 to see "no perspective for negotiations" for Purple-plus. Informateur Rosenthal subsequently invited Verhagen (CDA), Cohen (PvdA) and Rutte (VVD) for exploring the center-coalition, though this was ruled out by Cohen.

Cohen then suggested a rainbow coalition (VVD+PvdA+CDA+D66+GL) that combines both Purple-plus and center-coalition options, but was rejected by the leaders of D66 and GroenLinks, and the proposal was withdrawn.

Informateur Tjeenk Willink 
On June 26, the Queen replaced Rosenthal with Herman Tjeenk Willink, vice president of the Council of State, as informateur.  Willink's appointment was unusual, as it went against the advice of Rosenthal and most party leaders involved in the talks, who preferred two informateurs, one from the VVD and one from the PvdA.

Rutte extended another invitation to the PVV to join the VVD and CDA in coalition talks, but Wilders rejected the offer on June 29 as the CDA was unwilling to enter negotiations at the onset, instead of waiting for the VVD and PVV to conclude their talks first, extinguishing the likelihood that a right-wing VVD-PVV-CDA cabinet can be formed.

On July 5, Willink reported to the Queen that the VVD, PvdA, D66 and GroenLinks parties were prepared to enter negotiations to form a Purple-plus government.

Informateurs Rosenthal and Wallage 
The Queen appointed Rosenthal and Jacques Wallage as new informateurs after Willink's report.  The parties agreed to secrecy while negotiations are being held, but newspaper reports have suggested that an agreement would be focus on a small set of common policies while leaving flexibility to negotiate with non-government parties, and the likely cabinet would have eight to ten ministers (3 VVD, 3 PvdA, 1 D66, 1 GL in case of eight ministers).

On July 20, VVD, PvdA, D66 and GroenLinks concluded that there was no basis to continue to negotiate a purple-plus coalition. Negotiations were aborted. It was concluded that the positions of the VVD and the PvdA on cutbacks and housing market reform were too far apart. The next day Rosenthal and Wallage reported to the Queen that the formation of a purple-plus government was impossible, throwing the formation wide open again.

Informateur Lubbers
Later on July 21, the Queen consulted her advisers and also sought advise from one of her Ministers of State, Ruud Lubbers (CDA), who was subsequently named informateur. Lubbers was assigned the task to investigate anew the possibilities for the formation of a majority government and to check for the sincerity and persistence of obstacles and vetoes that different parties have created about each other's participation in government. The next few days Lubbers held talks with all chairs of the parliamentary parties in order to find common ground.

During the explorations of Lubbers, a preliminary agreement was reached. For the first time in political history, The Netherlands might be governed by a minority cabinet supported by a third party outside the government. There would be two contracts drawn up: the actual government agreement between VVD and CDA and a so-called "gedoogakkoord" (tolerance agreement) between the cabinet and PVV. The agreement would handle matters such as immigration, integration, asylum, and law and order. This means there could be agreements on issues raised especially by the PVV in its campaign, like family reunification, on newcomers paying into social security before being eligible to receive it. Even more controversially regulations on the clothing of civil servants could be introduced – which means headscarves and other religious symbols might be banned in the civil service. Informateur Lubbers called it a “special majority cabinet” rather than a minority government.

Informateur Opstelten 
On August 5, 2010, VVD Chairman Ivo Opstelten, the former mayor of Utrecht and Rotterdam, was appointed by the Dutch queen as the new mediator in the next stage of actual negotiations to form a cabinet. On August 9, 2010, talks on forming a minority government with VVD and CDA supported by the PVV in parliament began. The three party leaders were each accompanied by a colleague. Mark Rutte (VVD) had Edith Schippers MP with him, Maxime Verhagen (CDA) was accompanied by caretaker health minister Ab Klink and Geert Wilders (PVV) chose Barry Madlener MEP. Opstelten repeated that he expected a resolution in about three weeks.

Members of the CDA resisted to the negotiations of their party leader with the PVV. On August 12, 2010, a group of 44 members published an open letter in the Christian daily newspaper Trouw, opposing any coalition partnership with the PVV, accusing the party of stigmatising minorities: "In its political statements and electoral platform, the PVV has gone against many of our fundamental rights, notably the right to equal treatment and the right to freely practice religion according to one's beliefs... The PVV stigmatises a large minority of our population and in fact makes it the scapegoat of nearly all our social problems. The PVV is not only a threat to the freedom of Muslims, but to our rule of law and our freedom." The protests within CDA grew, and on 29 August a group of influential CDA members led by Cees Veerman appealed their party to stop negotiations. On 31 August and 1 September CDA MP Ab Klink, who was part of the negotiating delegation protested the negotiations. The negotiations were paused and the CDA MP's spent most of August 31 and September 1 discussing their position. On September 1 a letter by Ab Klink outlining his grave misgivings over the negotiations was leaked, complicating the effort at finding a solution within the CDA. Nevertheless, the result of the discussion was that negotiations would be resumed with Ab Klink resigning from the delegation and the CDA congress giving an important ruling after an agreement was reached. On September 2 Mark Rutte and Geert Wilders carefully considered the new situation with open dissidents in the (usually agreeing) CDA. On Friday 3 September, Geert Wilders left the negotiations when the CDA could not guarantee that the dissident CDA MP's would vote for any agreement; a guarantee that Maxime Verhagen, the leader of the CDA delegation, could not give as according to the Dutch constitution MP's are elected on personal title and should in all cases be free and unimpeded to vote according to their own judgment. On Saturday 4 September, Ivo Opstelten handed in his final report reporting failure to form a government to the Queen.

Informateur Tjeenk Willink (2) 
On September 6, 2010, Ab Klink decided to step down as MP because of the situation of the CDA. From September 7 on, he is replaced by Raymond Knops.

On September 7, the PVV said that they wanted to continue the negotiations with VVD and CDA because of Klink's departure. VVD and CDA also wanted to continue. Later that day, Mark Rutte went to the queen to discuss the new situation. After that, the queen once again appointed Herman Tjeenk Willink as informateur. He will speak with all of the party leaders about how the formation should proceed.

On September 13, Tjeenk Willink finished his report in which he advised to continue the negotiations between VVD, PVV and CDA.
On the same day, Ivo Opstelten was re-appointed as informateur.

Informateur Opstelten (2) 
After Ivo Opstelten was again appointed as informateur, he immediately restarted the negotiations between VVD, PVV and CDA. The CDA was internally deeply divided over cooperation with the PVV and several high-profile members, like Ernst Hirsch Ballin opposed it. On September 28, the negotiations were finished. A coalition agreement was reached between CDA and VVD, and a "toleration agreement" (a novelty in Dutch politics) was reached between PVV and the other two parties.
On October 14, 2010, the Rutte cabinet was sworn in by the queen.

References 

Cabinet of the Netherlands
Cabinet formation
People's Party for Freedom and Democracy
Christian Democratic Appeal
Party for Freedom
Dutch cabinet formation 2010
Dutch cabinet formation
Articles which contain graphical timelines
21st century in The Hague